The Pawnee Armory in Pawnee County, Oklahoma, United States, is a single story rectangular building measuring  x .  It was built of native stone by the Works Progress Administration.  According to the plaque on the building it was completed in 1936, though the application form for the National Historic Places Registration form indicates it was finished in 1937.  It originally housed the Oklahoma National Guard.
It was added to the National Register of Historic Places in 1994.

Gallery

References

Buildings and structures in Pawnee County, Oklahoma
Armories on the National Register of Historic Places in Oklahoma
Pawnee, Oklahoma
National Register of Historic Places in Pawnee County, Oklahoma
Works Progress Administration in Oklahoma
1936 establishments in Oklahoma
Buildings and structures completed in 1936